Ihm House may refer to:

Ihm House (Guttenberg, Iowa), listed on the National Register of Historic Places in Clayton County, Iowa
Ihm House (Barneveld, Wisconsin), listed on the National Register of Historic Places in Iowa County, Wisconsin